The Jaga are a Muslim  community found in the state of Uttar Pradesh in India.  They are also known as Jagawa and Jagabhatt.

Origin 

The Jaga are converts from the Hindu Jaga Bhatt caste. Like other Bhatt communities the Jaga were once a community of professional singers and genealogists.  The Jaga are found in the districts of Shahjahanpur, Bareilly, Farrukhabad, Hardoi, Unnao and Lucknow. They speak Urdu among themselves, and Hindi with outsiders.

Present circumstances 

The Jaga are divided into two sub-groups, the Ladua and Laggiha. Each of these two groups are strictly endogamous, and intermarriages between the two groups is rare.  In fact, like other Uttar Pradesh Muslims, the community practice both cross cousin and parallel cousin marriages. The Jaga are entirely Shia, but also incorporate folk beliefs.

Traditionally, the Jaga were engaged in composing poetry and reciting the poetry on special occasions. They were dependent on patrons, who were often the large landowners known as zamindars and in Awadh, the talukdars.  With the abolishment of the zamindar system by the Indian government at independence in 1947, the Jaga lost many of their patrons. The community are now mainly employed as landless agricultural labourers.

After independence of Pakistan in 1947, many members of Jaga community migrated to Pakistan.

See also 

 Muslim Raibhat
 Jaga

References 

Muslim communities of Uttar Pradesh
Social groups of Pakistan